Richard Vogt may refer to:
Richard Vogt (boxer) (1913–1988), German boxer
Richard Vogt (aircraft designer) (1894–1979), German aircraft designer
Richard Vogt (herpetologist) (born 1949), American scientist

See also 
Vogt (surname)